Bromberger may refer to:

Related to Bydgoszcz (Bromberg), a city in Poland:
 Bloody Sunday (1939), a 1939 massacre in Poland
 Bydgoszcz Canal, between the cities of Bydgoszcz and Nakło in Poland

People
 Christian Bromberger (born 1946), French professor of anthropology
 Dora Bromberger (1881–1942), German artist 
  (born 1944), French journalist and 2004 winner of the Prix Vérité
 Josef Bromberger (1903–1951), Hungarian-born American character actor 
 Hervé Bromberger (1918–1993), French film director and screenwriter
  (1906-1978), French writer and journalist
  (1912-1986), French writer, Le Figaro editor, and 1949 winner of the Albert Londres Prize
  (born 1982), German chess grandmaster
  (1937–2004), German journalist and screenwriter 
  (1927–2004), German athlete; see 1954 World Student Games

See also
 

German-language surnames
Toponymic surnames
Polish toponymic surnames
German toponymic surnames
Jewish surnames
Yiddish-language surnames